Elizabeth R. Guzman is a Peruvian-American politician and social worker elected to represent Virginia's 31st House of Delegates district in Virginia's House of Delegates. She serves on the House committees on Privileges and Elections and Cities, Counties, and Towns. Guzman was a Democratic candidate for Virginia Lieutenant Governor in 2021.

Guzman also works as a Court Appointed Service Advocate for CASA CIS to prevent child abuse.

Guzman was Virginia co-chair of the Bernie Sanders 2020 presidential campaign.  In June 2020, Guzman was elected at the Democratic Party of Virginia State Convention to represent the Commonwealth of Virginia to the DNC.

Early life 
Born in Peru, Guzman immigrated to the United States and became a social worker. After settling in Virginia, Guzman worked three jobs to afford a one-bedroom apartment for herself and her daughter.

Career 
In 2017, Guzman ran for state Delegate and unseated eight-term incumbent Republican Delegate Scott Lingamfelter.

Guzman and Hala Ayala became the first Hispanic women elected to the House, all in Virginia's November 2017 election. Their terms began in January 2018.

Guzman delivered the Spanish response to the 2018 State of the Union Address, invited by Nancy Pelosi.

In August 2019, Elizabeth Warren endorsed Guzman. The Virginia Education Association Fund for Children and Public Education has also endorsed her based on her record of voting for legislation supporting public education.

Guzman is a progressive, and has criticized the Democratic Party for its traditionally centrist ideology.

Following the suspension of the Sanders Campaign, Guzman endorsed Joe Biden for President on April 10, 2020.

2021 lieutenant governor campaign 
Guzman announced her candidacy for Lieutenant Governor in October 2020.  Guzman came in 3rd place in the first straw poll of the cycle at a Hunter Mill District Democratic Committee meeting, behind 1st place Sam Rasoul and 2nd place Sean Perryman. On April 17, Guzman withdrew from the Lieutenant Governor's race to focus on her reelection campaign for Delegate.

Political positions

Labor
Guzman supports Medicaid for All, and a $15 per hour minimum wage.

Parental rights
Guzman introduced a bill in the House of Delegates that would expand the state’s definition of child abuse to include parents who do not affirm their child’s gender identity or sexual orientation.

Electoral history

Awards
In May 2019, Guzman was given “The First” award from Latino Victory Fund. The Library of Virginia selected her as one of the changemakers in its "New Virginians" program.

See also 
 2017 Virginia House of Delegates election
 2019 Virginia House of Delegates election

References

External links 
 Campaign website

21st-century American politicians
21st-century American women politicians
Capella University alumni
American social democrats
American politicians of Peruvian descent
Hispanic and Latino American state legislators in Virginia
Hispanic and Latino American women in politics
Living people
Democratic Party members of the Virginia House of Delegates
People from Lima
Peruvian emigrants to the United States
People from Dale City, Virginia
Women state legislators in Virginia
Year of birth missing (living people)